Hello Old Friend may refer to:

 "Hello Old Friend" (James Taylor song)
 "Hello Old Friend" (Eric Clapton song)